Peter Hood is the former chairman of the Bradford Bulls, an English rugby league squad.

References

Bradford Bulls
Living people
Year of birth missing (living people)
Place of birth missing (living people)